Big Spring Township is one of the fifteen townships of Seneca County, Ohio, United States.  The 2010 census found 1,769 people in the township, 1,520 of whom lived in the unincorporated portions of the township.

Geography
Located in the southwestern corner of the county, it borders the following townships:
Loudon Township - north
Hopewell Township - northeast corner
Seneca Township - east
Tymochtee Township, Wyandot County - southeast corner
Crawford Township, Wyandot County - south
Ridge Township, Wyandot County - southwest corner
Biglick Township, Hancock County - west
Washington Township, Hancock County - northwest corner

The village of New Riegel is located in eastern Big Spring Township, and the unincorporated community of Alvada lies in the western part of the township. Big Spring Township also contains the unincorporated communities of Adrian and Springville.

Name and history
Big Spring Township was organized in 1833. It was named from a creek in the southwestern part.

It is the only Big Spring Township statewide.

Government
The township is governed by a three-member board of trustees, who are elected in November of odd-numbered years to a four-year term beginning on the following January 1. Two are elected in the year after the presidential election and one is elected in the year before it. There is also an elected township fiscal officer, who serves a four-year term beginning on April 1 of the year after the election, which is held in November of the year before the presidential election. Vacancies in the fiscal officership or on the board of trustees are filled by the remaining trustees.

References

External links
County website

Townships in Seneca County, Ohio
Townships in Ohio